This is a list of notable Finnish sweets and desserts. The cuisine of Finland refers to food preparation originating from Finland or having played a great historic part in Finnish cuisine. Finland also shares many dishes and influences with surrounding Scandinavian countries, such as Norway, Sweden, and Denmark, as well as Russia.

Characteristics
Finnish desserts are mainly influenced by berries and fruits that can be grown in colder climates, such as bilberries, lingonberries, cloudberries, and strawberries. Wholemeal flour such as rye and potato flour are also common. It is also influenced by Russian dishes and Eastern European culture, specifically Fennoscandian and Western Russian influences. Desserts tend to be rather plain and simple, yet hearty, and frequently served with cream, berries, and nuts.

Finnish desserts

Gallery

See also
 Finnish cuisine
 List of desserts

References

 
Finland